Herman Aav (2 September 1878 Hellamaa, Estonia – 14 January 1961 Kuopio, Finland) was an Estonian Orthodox bishop who served from 1925 to 1960 as archbishop of the Finnish Orthodox Church. He was also a composer and author whose works have been published both in Estonia and Finland, some of them under pen name "H. Lumilill".

References

1878 births
1961 deaths
20th-century Estonian people
20th-century Eastern Orthodox bishops
Eastern Orthodox Archbishops of Finland
Eastern Orthodox Christians from Estonia
Finnish people of Estonian descent